Metropolitan University or MU is a private university in Sylhet and was established in 2003 by a social worker, Toufique Rahman Chowdhury, with the approval of the Ministry of Education under the Private University Act, 1992 (amended in 1998).

Achievements 
Metropolitan University has been approved and accredited by the Government of the People's Republic of Bangladesh and University Grants Commission (UGC) of Bangladesh.

Besides, Metropolitan University is an Institutional Member of the Association of Management Development Institution in South Asia (AMDISA) and the Member of Association of Management Development Institution in Bangladesh.

The Chairman of Accreditation Service of International College (ASIC), Moris Dimok, inspected Metropolitan University on 6 October 2014 and expressed satisfaction by observing the atmosphere of university. On 19 December 2009, Ataul Karim, Vice President (Research), Old Dominion University, US paid a visit to Metropolitan University. Muhammed Zafar Iqbal, Head of the Department of Computer Science & Technology of Shahjalal University of Science and Technology (SUST), Sylhet also visited the Project Fair of Metropolitan University.

The university has four schools and six departments. These are:

List of vice-chancellors 
 Prof. Dr. Md. Saleh Uddin ( present )

School of Science & Technology
There are three engineering departments. Both departments are currently offering B.Sc.(Engg.) degree. The dean is Md. Nazrul Haque.

Departments 
 Department of Computer Science & Engineering (CSE)
 Department of Software Engineering (SE)   
 Department of Electrical & Electronics Engineering (EEE)

School of Business & Economics
This is the business school of the university. Currently two departments are running under the school. The dean is Md. Taher Billal Khalifa.

Departments 
 Department of Business Administration
 Department of Economics

School of Humanities & Social Sciences
The dean is Suresh Ranjan Basak.

Departments 
 Department of English

School of Law & Justice
The dean is M. Rabiul Hossain.

Departments 
 Department of Law and Justice

Courses

Undergraduate course
University offers the following undergraduate programmes:
 B.Sc. (Engg.) in Computer Science & Engineering.
 B.Sc. (Engg.) in Electrical & Electronics Engineering.
 B.Sc. (Hons) in Economics
 B.A. (Hons) in English
 Bachelor of Business Administration
 LL.B. (Honours)

Graduate course
The following degree programmes are available for graduate students:
 M.Sc. in Management Information System
 M.A. in English
 Master of Business Administration
 Executive Master of Business Administration
 LL.M

Short course
Metropolitan University offers two short course. These are:
 Android Application Development 
 Micro-controller Programming

Academic calendar
MU runs two semesters in an academic year. These are as follows:

Convocation

Institutes
 Institute of Business & Information Technology (IBIT)

Research and publication 
Almost all the departments of the university are active in research oriented works and projects. Both the teachers and students frequently published various kind of research article in various international journals and conferences. The university also published a journal called Metropolitan University Journal in every two year. Metropolitan University has its own online news portal MUnews24

Affiliation & collaboration
Metropolitan University is a member of and has active collaboration with the following institution/ organization:
 Ministry of Education, Bangladesh
 University Grant Commission
 Association of Commonwealth Universities
 Accreditation Service for International Colleges
 Birmingham City University
 British Council
 Association of Management Development Institutions in South Asia (AMDISA)
 Association of Management Development Institutions in Bangladesh (AMDIB)

Scholarships
Metropolitan University offers various scholarship schemes to financially support the meritorious students. A student may avail the scholarship by his/her previous performance or current performance.

Metropolitan University offers the following scholarships to the meritorious students:
 University Gold Medal
 University Merit Scholarship
 Chairman's Scholarship
 Vice Chancellor's Scholarship

Footnotes

External links
 

Educational institutions established in 2003
Education in Sylhet
2003 establishments in Bangladesh
Private universities in Bangladesh